Rockport State Park may refer to:

 Rockport State Park (Utah)
 Rockport State Park (Washington)
 Rockport State Recreation Area (Michigan)